Alfred "Alfie" Hale (born 28 August 1939 in Waterford, Republic of Ireland) is a former Irish footballer and manager who played for several clubs in both the League of Ireland and the English League, most notably, Waterford, Aston Villa, Doncaster Rovers and Cork Celtic. During his career, Hale scored 153 goals in the League of Ireland and a further 66 with English League clubs. As an international, Hale also played for the Republic of Ireland.

After retiring as a player, Hale managed several teams in the League of Ireland, most notably, Cork Celtic, Waterford United and Kilkenny City. In June 2003, Hale and such other notable Waterford footballers as Davy Walsh, Paddy Coad, Peter Thomas, Jim Beglin and John O'Shea were honoured by the Waterford City Council and presented with a Waterford Crystal vase.

Playing career

Waterford
Hale spent much of his playing and coaching career at Waterford United. His father, three brothers and two uncles had all played for the club in the 1930s. In 1930 the trio even formed an all-Hale half-back line in a league game at home to Bohemians. At the age of 17 Hale junior along with Peter Fitzgerald (footballer) made a scoring League of Ireland debut at Kilcohan Park on St Patrick's Day 1957 in a 3–1 win over Bohemians

He left Waterford in 1960 but after seven seasons in the English League, he returned in 1966. Then together with Johnny Matthews, he became a central figure in a Waterford team that dominated the League of Ireland. In 1971–72 Hale was player-manager of the side when they beat Cork Hibernians in dramatic circumstances at Flower Lodge to claim his fifth league title in six seasons. In both 1971–72 and 1972–73 he also finished as joint top goalscorer in the league, scoring 22 and 20 goals respectively. He is also the 7th highest League of Ireland goalscorer of all time with 153 league goals. He was awarded a benefit game in August 1971.

He scored twice against AC Omonia in the 1972–73 European Cup.

Aston Villa
In June 1960, aged 19, Hale was sold by Waterford United to Aston Villa for a fee of £4,500. However, Hale failed to establish himself in the Villa first team and went on to make just 7 first team appearances, scoring 2 goals. Despite this Hale won his first international cap for the Republic of Ireland while at Villa.

Doncaster Rovers
Hale signed for Doncaster Rovers in the summer of 1962 and made his debut for the club on 18 August in a 2–0 defeat to Brentford in the Football League Fourth Division. He scored four goals in a single game as he helped Rovers to a record league win when they beat Darlington. In three seasons with Rovers, Hale made 119 league appearances and scored 42 goals. He also made 7 appearances for Rovers in the League Cup and 9 in the FA Cup, scoring 2 further goals.

Republic of Ireland international
Between 1962 and 1973, Hale made 14 appearances and scored 2 goals for the Republic of Ireland national football team. He made his senior international debut on 8 April 1962 in a 3–2 home defeat against Austria. Hale went on to score twice for the Republic of Ireland, both goals coming in 1968, against Poland and then Austria. He made his last appearance for the Republic of Ireland on 21 October 1973 as a substitute in a 1–0 home win against Poland.

Coaching career
As a manager, Hale would return to Waterford United for two further spells. During the first of these, between 1982 until 1986, he guided the club to victory in the League of Ireland Cup in 1985 and to the FAI Cup final in 1986. He returned to manage the club again between 1991 and 1993 and helped them achieve promotion from the First Division in 1992. In 2005, he briefly returned to Waterford United once again, this time acting as special advisor.

Aside from Waterford, Hale has also coached several other teams in the League of Ireland. He was appointed player/manager of Thurles Town in May 1981 where he made history by becoming the League of Ireland's oldest ever goalscorer, and also the only player to score in four different League of Ireland decades. As manager of Cobh Ramblers, Hale gave Roy Keane his debut in 1990. Between 1995 and 1999 he was manager of Kilkenny City and in 1997, with a team which included the likes of his Nephew Richie, Brendan Rea, Paul Cashin and Pascal Keane, he guided them to the First Division title. After leaving Kilkenny, Hale remained active in junior football working with Waterford Crystal F.C. and Tramore F.C, winning the first league in 50 years with Tramore in 2000–01.

Businessman
At the same time as managing various League of Ireland clubs, Hale also established himself as a businessman in the Waterford area. In 1978, he opened a sports shop, later trading under the name Alfie Hale's Intersport and located at Arundal Square. He also owns a chain of pubs including Alfie Hale's Bar in Ballybricken and Alfie Hale's Sports Bar on Lombard Street.

In December 2008, he settled with the Revenue Commissioners for over €100,000.

At the end of the 2012 League of Ireland season, Hale was tenth in the all-time League of Ireland goalscoring list with 153 league goals.

Honours

Player
Waterford

League of Ireland
1967–68, 1968–69, 1969–70, 1971–72, 1972–73:
League of Ireland Shield
1968–69:
Top Four Cup
1967–68, 1968–69, 1969–70, 1970–71, 1972–73:
Munster Senior Cup
1965–66, 1966–67:
 SWAI Personality of the Year
 1972–73

Player manager
Cork Celtic

League of Ireland
1973–74:

Manager
Waterford

League of Ireland Cup
1984–85:
Munster Senior Cup
1985–86:

Kilkenny City

League of Ireland First Division
1996–97:

References

Who's Who of Aston Villa (2004): Tony Matthews 
The Boys in Green – The FAI International Story (1997): Sean Ryan

External links
Honoured by Waterford City Council
 Career details with Waterford

1939 births
Living people
Association football inside forwards
Republic of Ireland association footballers
Republic of Ireland international footballers
Republic of Ireland expatriate association footballers
English Football League players
League of Ireland players
Aston Villa F.C. players
Doncaster Rovers F.C. players
Limerick F.C. players
Newport County A.F.C. players
Waterford F.C. players
St Patrick's Athletic F.C. players
Waterford F.C. managers
Republic of Ireland football managers
League of Ireland managers
Association footballers from County Waterford
Irish businesspeople
Cork Celtic F.C. players
Cork Hibernians F.C. players
League of Ireland XI players